A nerve is a part of the peripheral nervous system.

Nerve or Nerves may also refer to:

Mathematics
 Nerve of a covering, a construction in mathematical topology
 Nerve (category theory), a construction in category theory

Film and television
 Nerves (film), a 1919 film by the Austrian director and novelist Robert Reinert
 "Nerve" (Farscape), a 2000 episode of Farscape
 Nerve (2013 film), a 2013 Australian psychological thriller film
 Nerve (2016 film), a 2016 American drama thriller film

Books
 Nerve (magazine), a Liverpool-based arts and social issues magazine
 Nerve (Francis novel), a 1964 novel by Dick Francis
 Nerve (Ryan novel), a 2012 young adult thriller by Jeanne Ryan

Computing
 Nerve Software, a video game developer
 Nerve (website), a website and magazine

Music

Artists 

 The Nerves, an American power pop band
 Nerve, an American band founded by Jojo Mayer
 Nerve, an industrial rock band that Junkie XL was a member of

Songs 

 "nerve", by Bis from Brand-new idol Society, 2011
 "Nerve", by Blindside from Blindside, 1997
 "Nerve", by Charlotte Church from Two, 2013
 "Nerve", by Don Broco from Automatic, 2015
 "Nerve", by Half Moon Run from Dark Eyes, 2012
 "Nerve", by Soilwork from Stabbing the Drama, 2005
 "Nerve", by The Story So Far from The Story So Far, 2015
 "Nerves", by Bauhaus from In the Flat Field, 1980
 "Nerves", by Maths Class, 2008
 "Nerves", by Silkworm from Firewater, 1996
 "The Nerve", by George Strait from Carrying Your Love with Me, 1997
 "The Nerve", by Kaiser Chiefs from Education, Education, Education & War, 2014

Other uses
 Nerve (botany), another word for the vein of a leaf

See also 
 Nerv (disambiguation)